Sanjay Patel is an Indo-Canadian filmmaker mostly known for his 2017 film Union Leader which was screened at the 48th International Film Festival of India in 2017. He also directed the  award winning short film If You Love Your Children in 2014. Patel is the author of the book The Future of Oil.

Biography 
Patel studied chemical engineering in India. He worked in a chemical plant in Gujarat for around seven years prior to moving to Canada in 2000. 
Patel, without any formal study of filmmaking, directed and produced his first short film called If You Love Your Children in 2014 receiving multiple awards and nominations since its release. In 2012, he published his first book titled The Future of Oil.

Filmography

References

External links
 

Living people
Film directors from Gujarat
Film directors from Alberta
Screenwriters from Gujarat
Canadian people of Indian descent
Film producers from Gujarat
1971 births
People from Fort McMurray
Asian-Canadian filmmakers